The 2010–11 Coupe Gambardella was the 56th edition of the French youth cup competition reserved for male under-19 football players. The competition was organized by the French Football Federation. The final was contested on 14 May 2011 and served as a curtain raiser for the 2011 Coupe de France Final. The defending champions were Metz, who defeated Sochaux 4–3 on penalties in last year's final. On 14 May, the under 19-team of AS Monaco defeated Saint-Étienne 4–3 on penalties in the 2011 Coupe Gambardella Final to win the Coupe Gambardella title. The title is the club's third in its history having won the title previously in 1962 and 1972

Calendar 
On 21 August 2010, the French Football Federation announced the calendar for the 2010–11 edition of the Coupe Gambardella.

Matches

First round 
The draw for the first round of the Coupe Gambardella was held on 25 November 2010 at the headquarters of the French Football Federation and was conducted by Fernand Duchaussoy, the president of the federation, Henri Monteil, the general secretary of the federation, Jean-Claude Hazeaux, general secretary of the Ligue du Football Amateur (LFA), and Jean-Pierre Dubédat, a LFA member representing the National Federal Commission for Youth Competitions. The matches were played on 11–12 December. The matches that were canceled due to inclement weather were played on 8–9 January. The rescheduled match that was canceled was played on 12 January.

Second round 
The draw for the second round of the Coupe Gambardella was held on 16 December at the headquarters of the French Football Federation and was conducted by Fernand Duchaussoy, the president of the federation and Guy Ferrier, a member of the Direction Technique Nationale. The matches were played on 15–16 January. The canceled matches were played on 19 January.

Round of 64 
The draw for the Round of 64 of the Coupe Gambardella was held on 20 January 2011 at the headquarters of the French Football Federation in Paris. The draw was conducted by Jean-Pierre Dubédat, a member of the Ligue du Football Amateur, and Alain Dessoly, a member of the Federal Youth Competition Committee. The matches were played on 5–7 February.

Round of 32 
The draw for the Round of 32 of the Coupe Gambardella was held on 10 February 2011 at the headquarters of Crédit Agricole in Paris. The draw was conducted by the assistant coach of the France national team Alain Boghossian and the head coach of the France national under-17 team Patrick Gonfalone. The matches were played on 26–27 February 2011.

Round of 16 
The draw for the Round of 16 of the Coupe Gambardella was held on 3 March 2011 at the headquarters of the French Football Federation in Paris. The draw was conducted by Jean Djorkaeff, the president of the Coupe de France Commission and Bernard Barbet, the president of the Ligue du Football Amateur. The matches were played on 16–20 March 2011.

Quarterfinals 
The draw for the quarterfinals of the Coupe Gambardella was held on 24 March 2011 at the headquarters of the French Football Federation in Paris. The draw was conducted by Eric Boucher and Pierre Ducasse. Boucher won the competition with Bordeaux in 1976, while Ducasse presently plays for the same club and participated in the competition in 2006. The matches were played on 6 and 10 April 2011.

Semi-finals 
The draw for the semi-finals of the Coupe Gambardella was held on the same day as the quarterfinal draw and was conducted by Boucher and Ducasse, as well. The matches will feature the four winners of the four quarterfinal matches and will be played at the Stade Robert Brettes in Mérignac. The matches will be contested on 1 May 2011.

Final

References

External links 
 Official site 

2010–11 domestic association football cups
2010–11 in French football